Charles-Omer Valois (April 24, 1924 – August 4, 2013) was a Canadian prelate of the Catholic Church.

Charles-Omer Valois was born in Montreal and was ordained a priest on June 3, 1950.
Valois was appointed bishop of the Diocese of Saint-Jérôme on June 10, 1977, and ordained bishop on June 29, 1977. Valois would resign from the diocese on January 22, 1997.

See also
Diocese of Saint-Jérôme

External links
Catholic-Hierarchy
Saint-Jérôme Diocese 

20th-century Roman Catholic bishops in Canada
Clergy from Montreal
1924 births
2013 deaths
Roman Catholic bishops of Saint-Jérôme